Jun Watanabe may refer to:

Jun Watanabe (architect) (born 1954), Japanese architect and former professor at Chubu University
Jun Watanabe (actor) (born 1982), Japanese stunt performer and suit actor

See also
Jin Watanabe (disambiguation)
Watanabe, the fifth most common Japanese surname